The Mister World competition is a male beauty pageant sponsored by the Miss World Organisation. The competition was founded in 1996. The entrants compete in various activities including waterskiing, mountain biking, and marathon running. The current Mister World is Jack Heslewood, an Aerospace Engineer from England, who was crowned on 23 August 2019 in Manila. He is the first ever English person to win a World title, the fifth European to be crowned Mister World in the 2019 contest. Traditionally, Mister World lives in London during his reign.

Titleholders

League tables

Country by number of wins

Continents by number of wins

See also
 Miss World
 Manhunt International
 Mister International
 Mister Global
 Mister Supranational
 Man of the World

References 

 
Male beauty pageants